Zurab Tsiskaridze (born 8 September 1986) is a Georgian footballer who plays for Swedish club Åtvidaberg.

Early life
Tsiskaridze was born in the Georgian SSR prior to the breakup of the Soviet Union in 1991. During early childhood, he moved to Poland where he lived for 10 years in the city of Warsaw with his family. Later on he moved around the globe pursuing his professional career.

Career

Youth
He began his career 2004 in Brazil with the U-20 team with Limeira based club Associação Atlética Internacional and played then the first six months in 2005 with the U-20 side of Grêmio Recreativo Barueri. He earned himself a tryout with D.C. United before his senior year of high school, but was not offered a contract by the team, who advised him to play college soccer. Instead, Tsiskaridze left school to pursue a professional soccer career, travelling to Brazil and France, among other countries.

Professional
Tsiskaridze spent time with the Kansas City Wizards reserves in 2007, but when offered the minimum salary contract, he decided to pursue his dream of playing in Europe. He spent eighteen months with the reserve and first team of FC Sète, and in 2008 played seven games in the French third division Championnat National.

Tsiskaridze was signed by USL First Division side Miami FC in April 2009, after impressing Zinho and the coaching staff during an open tryout. Tsiskaridze had traveled all the way from France for the event. He played 18 games and scored one goal for Miami in his first season in the league. On 2 December 2009, he signed a one-year contract with Vancouver Whitecaps.

On 19 October 2010, the Vancouver Whitecaps released Tsiskaridze, along with five fellow players, citing their need to purge certain players in preparation for their upcoming promotion to Major League Soccer.

On 17 February 2011, he signed a new contract with Montreal Impact for the last season of the club in NASL, before the entry of the Impact in the MLS in 2012. After spending a season in the Russian Premier League he signed a short-term contract with Swedish Superettan club Jönköpings Södra IF in the summer of 2012. At the end of the season he extended his contract for one more year.

Personal life
He speaks 7 languages, and ironically, Georgian isn't one of them, as he barely speaks it. He speaks Russian, which he learnt from his stepdad; Polish; English; Portuguese; Spanish; Czech; and French.

His mother was a ballerina, while his father was an opera singer. He is relatives with the ballet dancer Nikolay Tsiskaridze.

During the perestroika, he moved to Poland with his mum and stepdad, while his biological father moved to the United States. Later, he moved to live with his biological father, and graduated school in American.

Career stats

References

External links
 
 Miami FC bio (miamifc.com)
 
 Zurab Tsiskaridze at Fotbolltransfers.com 
 Zurab Tsiskaridze at Eurosport.com
 

1986 births
Living people
Footballers from Tbilisi
Footballers from Georgia (country)
Expatriate footballers from Georgia (country)
American soccer players
American expatriate soccer players
Association football defenders
Georgia (country) international footballers
Soccer players from Virginia
Legia Warsaw players
Associação Atlética Internacional (Limeira) players
Grêmio Barueri Futebol players
FC Sète 34 players
Miami FC (2006) players
Vancouver Whitecaps (1986–2010) players
Montreal Impact (1992–2011) players
Al-Hazem F.C. players
Al-Jabalain FC players
FC Amkar Perm players
Jönköpings Södra IF players
Zurab Tsiskaridze
San Antonio Scorpions players
FK Teplice players
AFC Eskilstuna players
Rovaniemen Palloseura players
Vasalunds IF players
Åtvidabergs FF players
Zurab Tsiskaridze
USL First Division players
Saudi Professional League players
Saudi First Division League players
USSF Division 2 Professional League players
North American Soccer League players
Czech First League players
Allsvenskan players
Russian Premier League players
Superettan players
Veikkausliiga players
Ettan Fotboll players
Expatriate sportspeople from Georgia (country) in the Czech Republic
Expatriate sportspeople from Georgia (country) in France
Expatriate sportspeople from Georgia (country) in the United States
Expatriate sportspeople from Georgia (country) in Poland
Expatriate sportspeople from Georgia (country) in Russia
Expatriate sportspeople from Georgia (country) in Finland
Expatriate sportspeople from Georgia (country) in Sweden
Expatriate footballers in the Czech Republic
Expatriate footballers in Brazil
Expatriate footballers in France
Expatriate soccer players in the United States
Expatriate soccer players in Canada
Expatriate footballers in Poland
Expatriate footballers in Russia
Expatriate footballers in Saudi Arabia
Expatriate footballers in Thailand
Expatriate footballers in Finland
Expatriate footballers in Sweden